Sephisa dichroa, the western courtier, is a species of nymphalid butterfly found in South and Southeast Asia. In South Asia, they are found along the Himalayas.

Notes

References
"Sephisa Moore, 1882" at Markku Savela's Lepidoptera and Some Other Life Forms

Apaturinae
Butterflies of Asia
Butterflies described in 1844